Chrysotus arkansensis is a species of long-legged fly in the family Dolichopodidae. It was described from six specimens, which were collected from Fayetteville, Arkansas in 1906.

References

Diaphorinae
Articles created by Qbugbot
Insects described in 1930